Saltoposuchus is an extinct genus of small (1–1.5 m and 10–15 kg), long-tailed crocodylomorph reptile (Sphenosuchia), from the Norian (Late Triassic) of Europe. The name translated means "leaping foot crocodile". It has been proposed that Terrestrisuchus gracilis and Saltoposuchus connectens represent different ontogenetic stages of the same genus. Saltoposuchus was commonly (and incorrectly) referred to in popular literature as the ancestor (or close ancestors) to dinosaurs, however, recent scientific research show that this is not the case.

Description and paleobiology 

Fossil evidence of Sphenosuchia and early crocodylomorphs lead paleontologists to conclude that Saltoposuchus is a terrestrial animal. As a monophyletic group of crocodylomorphs, Saltoposuchidae have many key morphological traits shared with most crocodylomorphs.

Skull 
Much like other crocodylomorphs, Saltoposuchus skulls had a (reduced) antorbital fenestra, an overhanging squamosal bone, and a medially shifted, forwards sloping quadrate and quadratojugal. Saltoposuchus have a long pointed skull and slender pointed teeth. The pointed teeth of Saltoposuchus indicate that this species is most likely carnivorous. At the back of the skull, Saltoposuchus share many specializations of crocodylomorphs including a square skull table made out of post-orbital and squamosal bones which overhangs the temporal region, a lateral mandibular fenestra, and a cheek region that is overhung by the squamosal. In Sphenosucians, the quadrate head makes contact with the prootic and squamosal bones.

Skeleton 
Saltoposuchus a long backward pointing spine at the coracoid. Another key feature of Saltoposuchus includes a non-preforated acetabulum (hip joint), which is a defining characteristic of all dinosaurs. Saltoposuchus were also considered to be bipedal based on its skeletal constitution, but could walk on all four limbs as well, making it a facultative biped. Saltoposuchus also had a double row of bony scutes along its back, which can be seen on modern crocodilians today.  Like with other sphenosuchians and early crocodylomorphs, Saltoposuchus had fully erect slender limbs, a slender body, and long legs. Paleontologists believe that with their body structures that Saltoposuchus were very fast and nimble. Sphenosuchians have been described as "greyhound dog[s] with scales and a long tail." Early crocodylomorphs, such as Saltoposuchus, have very long centra in their vertebrae, short vertebral processes, and medium-sized zygapophyseal joints. Molnar et Al. concluded that the average mediolateral range of motion in the early crocodylomorphs was greater than dorsoventral range of motion, and dorsoventral stiffness was estimated to be higher than mediolateral stiffness. In the wrists of Saltoposuchus, the radiale and ulnare are elongated into rod shaped elements instead of being button-shaped, which is a shared characteristic among crocodylomorphs.

Behavior 
The Saltoposuchus is a terrestrial animal whose body was built for running at fast speeds. Based on the behavior of other species of archosaur, it is possible that the Saltoposuchus hunted in packs just like another archosaur genus, Coelophysis.  It is also possible that Saltoposuchus could exhibit cannibalistic behavior because a few of the Coelophysis individuals found had remains of smaller members of the species inside the larger animals. By looking at the diet of related species, we can assume that Saltoposuchus  ate small lizards, insects, and mammals that existed during the Triassic Period.

Discovery 
Saltoposuchus connectens and Saltoposuchus longipes were discovered and named by German paleontologist Friedrich von Huene in 1921. Both species were found in the Burrer Quarry, Pfaffenhofen, which is an Alaunian terrestrial sandstone/marl in the Löwenstein Formation of south-west Germany. The Löwenstein Formation has been dated back to 215.6 - 212.0 Ma, which dates back to the Late Triassic Period. Fossils have also been found in the Trossingen Formation (also located in Germany), and the Lossiemouth Sandstone formation.

Geographical/historical information 
Fossils found in Germany indicate that Saltoposuchus existed in Europe, or more appropriately, Laurasia. The Mesozoic Era has been regarded as "The Age of Reptiles" so Saltoposuchus lived among many different species including the earliest species of pterosaurs and other bipedal reptilians. Archosaurs, the ancestor to Crocodylomorpha, made its first appearance in the middle of the Triassic era. This is also the period in which the earliest mammals started appearing. Therapsids dominated the Early - Middle Triassic Period, but as time went on, therapsids started becoming extinct and archosaurs became the dominant group of reptiles. After the Permian–Triassic extinction event wiped out 90% of species in the world, conifer forests started to recover, species started occupying and thriving in newly found ecological niches, Pangaea started splitting into Laurasia and Gondwana, and the air was very arid with hot summers and cold winters. After marine life had been wiped out by the mass extinction event, the Triassic waters were populated with very few families of fish. The Triassic Period showed the first development of modern stony corals and a time of modest reef building activity in the shallower waters of the Tethys near the coasts of Pangaea. During the Mesozoic Era, early mammals, reptilian species, and other insects populated the land. Insects that had survived the mass extinction and were existing during this time include spiders, scorpions, millipedes, centipedes, and a newer group of beetles.

Related species 
Sister groups to Saltoposuchus include Gracilisuchus, Hesperosuchus, Dromicosuchus, Dibothrosuchus, Terrestrisuchus, Litargosuchus, Kayentasuchus. These genus are found in the late Triassic to the earlier Jurassic eras. All of these genus are part of the Sphenosuchia clade and they all have similar morphology and stature. Sphenosuchia are ancestors to crocodyliformes, which constitute modern crocodilians. Modern crocodylia reacquired semi-aquatic life style. Research has disputed the reasoning for how crocodyliformes reacquired semi-aquatic traits, and the forefront explanation the changes in osteoderm and rib morphology over crocodylomorph evolution affected the stiffness of the vertebral columns, which would allow for better movement in semi-aquatic environments.

Gracilisuchus 
This group has species that are approximately 0.3 meters long and is classified as a primitive sphenosuchian. Like Saltoposuchus, this species was thought to have been able to run on its slim hindlegs. This group of reptiles had a disproportionately large head, strong jaws, and bony plates extending from the back to the tail. It most likely ate small lizards.

Terrestrisuchus 
This group's specimens are around 0.5 meters long. Similarly to Saltoposuchus, Terrestrisuchus were known to have a delicate frame and could run at fast speeds for long distances.

Litargosuchus and Kayentasuchus 
Two early crocodylamorph species that are sister groups to Saltoposuchus. They share many similar traits and morphology with Saltoposuchus and the discovery of these groups convinced Paleontologists that these genus are not monophyletic with Sphenosuchus (not to be confused with the suborder Sphenosuchia).

References

External links
 Palaeos
 Mikko's Phylogeny Archive
 Clarke

Triassic crocodylomorpha
Terrestrial crocodylomorphs
Late Triassic reptiles of Europe
Triassic archosaurs
Late Triassic archosaurs
Taxa named by Friedrich von Huene
Fossil taxa described in 1921
Prehistoric pseudosuchian genera